Severe Cyclonic Storm Helen was a relatively weak tropical cyclone that formed in the Bay of Bengal Region on 18 November 2013, from the remnants of Tropical Storm Podul. It was classified as Deep Depression BOB 06 by the IMD on 19 November. As it was moving on a very slow northwest direction on 20 November, it became Cyclonic Storm Helen as it brought light to heavy rainfall in eastern India. It then became a Severe Cyclonic Storm on the afternoon hours of 21 November.

Meteorological history

Late on 17 November, the remnant energy of Tropical Storm Podul contributed to the development of a trough over the Bay of Bengal, located near the Andaman Islands. During the next couple of days, the storm slowly organized and consolidated, prompting the Joint Typhoon Warning Center (JTWC) to issue a Tropical Cyclone Formation Alert (TCFA) during the early hours of 19 November. Later on the same day, the India Meteorological Department (IMD) upgraded the storm to a depression, classifying it as BOB 06, followed by the JTWC reporting that the storm had reached Tropical Storm strength. A couple of hours later, the IMD upgraded BOB 06 into a Deep Depression, as the storm continued to intensify.

The storm slowly drifted west-northwestward, while deep convection consolidated around the system's well-defined center of circulation. In the early hours of 20 November, the IMD classified BOB 06 as a Cyclonic Storm, thereby officially naming it Helen.

Shortly before landfall, the storm's convection sheared to the north, causing its low level circulation to fully expose followed by the JTWC issuing its final bulletin, reporting that the storm had weakened due to land interaction. Helen made landfall south of Machilipatnam, Andhra Pradesh and rapidly deteriorated into a deep depression.

Preparations and Impact
The Andhra Pradesh government alerted all coastal districts of the state, especially southern coastal districts. The district collectors were directed to evacuate people from low-lying areas near the coast. More than 11,000 people were evacuated from the areas affected by the storm. Ten teams of the National Disaster Response Force were deployed for rescue operations in the affected areas. A total of 10 deaths have been reported in incidents related to the cyclone.

Three boats carrying 20 fishermen were reported missing, out of which two were reported as safe. The Coast Guard's vessel Avantibai and an HAL Chetak helicopter of the Navy have been dispatched for search and rescue of the third boat.

Helen brought extensive damage to Machilipatnam in Krishna district, with uprooted trees and electric lines. The districts of Krishna, East Godavari and Srikakulam, Visakhapatnam and Guntur suffered heavy rainfall. Heavy damage to harvest crops was also reported, with the West Godavari district being worst affected. Paddy, coconut and banana crops have suffered damage. The agricultural loss in Andhra Pradesh were amounted to be Rs50 billion (US$796 million).

See also
 Cyclone Viyaru
 Cyclone Maarutha
 Cyclone Bijli
 Cyclone Nilam
 Cyclone Laila
 Cyclone Phailin

References

External links
 Rapid Response - Cyclone Relief Organisation

2013 disasters in India
2013 North Indian Ocean cyclone season
History of Andhra Pradesh (1947–2014)
Disasters in Andhra Pradesh
Tropical cyclones in India
Severe cyclonic storms
Tropical cyclones in 2013